VL Kotka ("Eagle") was a Finnish two-seat, biplane maritime patrol aircraft, designed and built by the  or VL ("State Aircraft Factory"). It was meant as a cheaper replacement (compared to the Blackburn Ripon) for the outdated IVL A.22 Hansas that were in service with the Finnish Air Force.

The prototype made its first flight on September 30, 1930. In 1931, the State Aircraft Factory began production of a series of five aircraft. These were used as liaison aircraft until 1944.

One aircraft (KA-147) is on display at the Päijät-Häme Aviation Museum.

Versions
VL E.30 Kotka prototype KA-144 - this machine was built by the Finnish Government Aircraft Works, and was a prototype fitted with floats and a Bristol "Jupiter IV" engine.
VL E.30 Kotka I KA-145, 147 & 148 - three of the production aircraft (KA-145 – KA-148) fitted with regular landing gear (and could equip skis) and Wright R-1820-E Cyclone radial engines, 429 kW (575 hp).
VL E.30 Kotka I KA-146 - this machine was a Kotka I witted with the same or very similar floats to the ones the KA-144 Kotka prototype had.
VL E.31 Kotka II KA-149 - the last, more modified series production aircraft fitted with a Pratt & Whitney R-1690-B Hornet engine, (575 hp).
VL E.32 Kotka III - cancelled third series due to the type being outdated.

Operators
 
 Finnish Air Force.

Specifications (KA-147, land aircraft)

See also

References

Citations

External links

1930s Finnish military aircraft